North Heidelberg Football Club (North Heidelberg Sporting Club) is an Australian rules football club in Heidelberg West, Victoria, currently competing in Division 1 of the Northern Football  Netball League it also has 5 female netball teams competing in the NFNL on Friday nights in Bundoora.

Premierships

Northern Football League (Formerly Diamond Valley Football League)

Seniors: (8)

1962, 1978, 1985, 1987, 1994, 2005, 2014^, 2017^

Reserves: (12)

1964, 1976, 1977, 1985, 1986, 1987, 1988, 1989, 1990, 1992, 1994, 2014^

Thirds: (5)

1962, 1963, 1984, 1989, 1996

^Division 2

Notable players
Ross 'Twiggy' Dunne
Jason Heatley
Jake King
Shane Harvey
Jamie Shaw
Robert Powell
Brent Harvey

References

External links

  North Heidelberg Football Club homepage
 Northern Football League Website
 Old DV website

Northern Football League (Australia) clubs
Australian rules football clubs established in 1958
1958 establishments in Australia
Heidelberg, Victoria
Sport in the City of Banyule
Australian rules football clubs in Melbourne